The Roman Catholic Diocese of Limoeiro do Norte is a Latin rite suffragan diocese in the Ecclesiastical province of Fortaleza, both in Ceará state, northeast Brazil.

Its cathedral episcopal see is Catedral Nossa Senhora da Conceiçao, dedicated to Immaculate Conception, in the city of Limoeiro do Norte.

History 
 Established on 7 May 1938 as Diocese of Limoeiro do Norte by Pius XI's papal bulla Ad dominicum cuiusvis, on territory split off from its Metropolitan, the Archdiocese of Fortaleza.

Statistics 
As per 2014, it pastorally served 489,000 Catholics (90.4% of 541,000 total) on 18,440 km² in 25 parishes and 1 mission with 41 priests (28 diocesan, 13 religious), 73 lay religious (18 brothers, 55 sisters) and 9 seminarians.

Bishops
(all Roman rite)

Episcopal ordinaries
Suffragan Bishops of Limoeiro do Norte 
 Aureliano de Matos (1940.01.30 – death 1967.08.19), no previous prelature
 José Freire Falcão (1967.08.19 – 1971.11.25), succeeding as previous Titular Bishop of Vardimissa (1967.04.24 – 1967.08.19) as Coadjutor Bishop of Limoeiro do Norte (1967.04.24 – 1967.08.19); later Metropolitan Archbishop of Teresina (Brazil) (1971.11.25 – 1984.02.15), Metropolitan Archbishop of Brasília (Brazil) (1984.02.15 – 2004.01.28), Second Vice-President of Latin American Episcopal Council (1987 – 1991), created Cardinal-Priest of S. Luca a Via Prenestina (1988.06.28 – ...)
 Pompeu Bezerra Bessa (1973.01.25 – death 1994.05.18), died 2000
 Manuel Edmilson da Cruz (1994.05.18 – retired 1998.05.06), previously Titular Bishop of Vicus Cæsaris (1966.08.08 – 1994.05.18) as Auxiliary Bishop of Archdiocese of São Luís do Maranhão (Brazil) (1966.08.08 – 1974.07.03) and as Auxiliary Bishop of Archdiocese of Fortaleza (Brazil) (1974.07.03 – 1994.05.18), also Apostolic Administrator sede plena of Limoeiro do Norte (1992 – 1994.05.18)
 José Haring, Friars Minor (O.F.M.) (2000.01.19 – retired 2017.05.10)
 André Vital Félix da Silva, Dehonians (S.C.I.) (2017.05.10 – ...).

Coadjutor bishop
 José Freire Falcão (1967); future Cardinal

Other priest of this diocese who became bishop
José Mauro Ramalho de Alarcón Santiago, appointed Bishop of Iguatú, Ceara in 1961

See also 
 List of Catholic dioceses in Brazil

Sources and external links 
 GCatholic.org, with Google satellite photo - data for all sections
 Catholic Hierarchy

Roman Catholic Ecclesiastical Province of Fortaleza
Roman Catholic dioceses in Brazil
Religious organizations established in 1938
Roman Catholic dioceses and prelatures established in the 20th century
1938 establishments in Brazil